Summers Harford (1795 – 2 June 1873) was a British Radical politician.

Harford was elected a Radical Member of Parliament for Lewes at the 1841 general election, but was the next year unseated, upon an election petition, due to bribery and corruption.

References

External links
 

Members of the Parliament of the United Kingdom for English constituencies
UK MPs 1841–1847
1795 births
1873 deaths